Elongator complex protein 2 is a protein that in humans is encoded by the ELP2 gene.

Interactions
ELP2 has been shown to interact with STAT3 and Janus kinase 1.

References

Further reading